Vibratese is a method of communication through touch. It was developed by F. A. Geldard, 1957. It is a tactile system based on both practical considerations and on results from a set of controlled psychophysical experiments. Vibratese was composed of 45 basic elements, the tactile equivalent of numerals and letters. The entire English alphabet and numerals 0 to 9 could be communicated this way. Geldard reported that with proper training, rates of more than 35 words per minute were possible for reading.

References

External links
http://www.cim.mcgill.ca/~haptic/pub/JP-CIM-TR-06.pdf
http://cobweb.ecn.purdue.edu/~hongtan/pubs/PhDThesis/tan.chap6.pdf

Tactile alphabets
Writing systems introduced in 1957